Aboke is a town in the Kole District of the Northern Region of Uganda. It was the location of the Aboke abductions, in October 1996.

Location
Aboke is located in Akwiridid Parish, Aboke sub-county, Kole District, in the Lango sub-region, in Northern Uganda. The geographical coordinates of Aboke are:02°21'28.0"N, 32°40'59.0"E (Latitude:2.357778; Longitude:32.683056).

Overview
Aboke lies on the old Lira-Gulu Road, just north of the Okole River. The town is the location of the five-parish Aboke sub-county. The parishes in Aboke sub-county are: (a) Akwiridid (b) Apach (c) Apuru (d) Ogwangacuma and (e) Opeta.

The town is also the location of St. Mary's College Aboke Girls School, a residential girls-only secondary school administered by Italian nuns. It is at this school that the Aboke abductions occurred on the early morning of 10 October 1996.

Aboke abductions

The Lord's Resistance Army (LRA), the rebel group which started in January 1987 by Joseph Kony, began as a liberation group aimed at removing the National Resistance Movement led by Yoweri Museveni from power.

In the early 1990s the LRA began to receive support and supplies from the government of Sudan at that time. The character of the LRA changed. The rebels began to target civilians, mutilating those they thought to be government sympathisers and abducting children as child soldiers and sex slaves.

In the early morning hours of 10 October 1996, an estimated 300 rebels of the LRA invaded St Mary’s College Secondary School Aboke and abducted 139 young girls aged 13 to 16 years of age. Sister Rachele Frassera, an Italian nun, who was  the deputy headmistress at the school, followed the rebels and negotiated the release of 109 girls. The rebels kept the other 30 as sex slaves for their commanders.

Four of the girls died in captivity while the remaining 26 eventually escaped from Sudan, back to their families in Uganda. Many had babies fathered by the rebels, including Joseph Kony himself. The girl to escape was Catherine Ajok, who on 14 December 2008, escaped from the LRA when the UPDF bombed the LRA base in Garamba, in the DR Congo. She arrived at a UPDF base in Dungu, DRC, in March 2009.

See also 
 Langi people
 List of cities and towns in Uganda
 List of roads in Uganda

References

External links 
Former Aboke Students In Fundraising Drive As of 11 October 2016.

Kole District
Populated places in Northern Region, Uganda
Cities in the Great Rift Valley
Lango sub-region